Buehlau or Bühlau may refer to the following places in Saxony, Germany:
Bühlau (Dresden), a quarter of Dresden
Bühlau, a quarter of Großharthau in the district of Bautzen